Anthidium placitum is a species of bee in the family Megachilidae, the leaf-cutter, carder, or mason bees.

Distribution
North America

Synonyms
Synonyms for this species include:
Anthidium bernardinum Cockerell, 1904
Anthidium herperium dentipygum Swenk, 1914
Anthidium permaculatum Cockerell, 1925
Anthidium bernardinum var mesaverdense Schwarz, 1927
Anthidium niveumtarsum Schwarz, 1927

References

External links
Anatomical illustrations

placitum
Insects described in 1879
Taxa named by Ezra Townsend Cresson